Monte San Vito is a comune (municipality) in the Province of Ancona in the Italian region Marche, located about  west of Ancona, in the lower Esino valley.

Monte San Vito borders the following municipalities: Chiaravalle, Jesi, Monsano, Montemarciano, Morro d'Alba, San Marcello, Senigallia.

References

External links
 Official website

Cities and towns in the Marche